Ivano-Kuvalat (İvan-Qıwalat) is a rural locality (a selo) in Ivano-Kuvalatsky Selsoviet, Zilairsky District, Bashkortostan, Russia. The population was 430 as of 2010. There are 7 streets.

Geography 
Ivano-Kuvalat is located 50 km north of Zilair (the district's administrative centre) by road. Krasny Kushak is the nearest rural locality.

References 

Rural localities in Zilairsky District